Valentine Fabre (born September 26, 1976) is a French ski mountaineer. She works as a military physician in the 93rd Mountain Artillery Regiment and is married to the ski mountaineer Laurent Fabre.

Selected results 
 2005:
 2nd, French Championship team
 4th, European Championship relay race (together with Nathalie Bourillon and Véronique Lathuraz)
 2008:
 3rd, World Championship relay race (together with Corinne Favre, Véronique Lathuraz and Nathalie Bourillon)
 5th, World Championship team race (together with Véronique Lathuraz)
 2010:
 5th, World Championship relay race (together with Sandrine Favre and Laëtitia Roux)
 2021:
 Set women's speed record for traverse of the Haute Route of 26 hours, 21 minutes with teammate Hillary Gerardi.

Pierra Menta 

 2006: 5th, together with Muriel Vaudey
 2007: 3rd, together with Véronique Lathuraz
 2008: 9th, together with Magali Jacquemoud
 2012: 5th, together with Nina Cook Silitch

Trofeo Mezzalama 

 2011: 6th, together with Nina Cook Silitch and Lyndsay Meyer

External links 
 Valentine Fabre at skimountaineering.org

References 

1976 births
Living people
French female ski mountaineers
French military doctors
French Army officers
21st-century French women